Guimaras is an island province in the Philippines.

Guimaras may also refer to:

 Guimaras oil spill
 Guimaras State University
 Guimaras Strait

See also
Guimarães